Dominik Kovačić (born 5 January 1994) is a Croatian professional footballer who plays as a defender for Kisvárda.

Club career
In 2017, Kovačić signed for Swiss top flight side Lugano from NK Zagreb in the Croatian second division.

Before the 2018 season, he signed for Sheriff, Moldova's most successful club.

Before the second half of 2019/20, he signed for Lokomotiva in the Croatian top flight from Bosnia and Herzegovina team Široki Brijeg.

Before the second half of 2020/21, Kovačić was sent on loan to Vejle Boldklub in Denmark.

References

External links
 

1994 births
Living people
Footballers from Zagreb
Association football defenders
Croatian footballers
NK Zagreb players
FC Lugano players
FC Sheriff Tiraspol players
NK Široki Brijeg players
NK Lokomotiva Zagreb players
Vejle Boldklub players
FC U Craiova 1948 players
Kisvárda FC players
Croatian Football League players
First Football League (Croatia) players
Moldovan Super Liga players
Premier League of Bosnia and Herzegovina players
Danish Superliga players
Liga I players
Nemzeti Bajnokság I players
Croatian expatriate footballers
Expatriate footballers in Switzerland
Croatian expatriate sportspeople in Switzerland
Expatriate footballers in Moldova
Croatian expatriate sportspeople in Moldova
Expatriate footballers in Bosnia and Herzegovina
Croatian expatriate sportspeople in Bosnia and Herzegovina
Expatriate men's footballers in Denmark
Croatian expatriate sportspeople in Denmark
Expatriate footballers in Romania
Croatian expatriate sportspeople in Romania
Expatriate footballers in Hungary
Croatian expatriate sportspeople in Hungary